Jukwa is a village in the Central region of Ghana. The village is known for the Jukwa Secondary School.  The school is a second cycle institution.

References

Populated places in the Central Region (Ghana)